Western News & Info, Inc. is a multi-media company owned by the Soldwedel family. In 2016, the company headquarters moved from Yuma, Arizona to Prescott Valley, Arizona.

References

External links
 

Mass media companies of the United States
Newspaper companies of the United States